Andor Basch (Budapest, 1885 – Budapest, 1944) was a Hungarian painter whose works have been featured in the Hungarian National Gallery.

References 
 
 
 

1885 births
1944 suicides
Artists from Budapest
Académie Julian alumni
Painters who committed suicide
Suicides in Hungary
Jewish painters
20th-century Hungarian painters
20th-century Hungarian male artists
1944 deaths
Hungarian male painters